Pascal Le Boeuf (born August 3, 1986) is a pianist, composer and producer whose works both solo and with others ranges from modern improvised music to cross-breeding classical with production-based technology.

Le Boeuf was nominated for a Grammy Award for Best Instrumental Composition for the work "Alkaline" and “Snapshots”.

He also co-leads the jazz group Le Boeuf Brothers with his twin brother Remy Le Boeuf.

Career
Le Boeuf was born in Santa Cruz, California. He studied jazz piano at the Manhattan School of Music with Kenny Barron (Bachelors in Music in 2007 and Masters in Music in 2010) and music composition at Princeton University with Steve Mackey, Dmitri Tymoczko, Rudresh Mahanthappa, Donnacha Dennehy, and Louis Andriessen.

In 2004, Pascal and his twin brother Remy formed Le Boeuf Brothers and together released four albums, mixing jazz, hip hop, electronic and classical styles.
  
Le Boeuf's solo career includes Pascal's Triangle, the album recorded as a piano trio with bassist Linda May Han Oh and drummer Justin Brown), and he composed music for the 2008 Emmy Award-winning movie King Lines. He played as support for D’Angelo’s Second Coming US tour and the British electronic group Clean Bandit with Australian pop vocalist Meg Mac.

Since 2015, Le Boeuf's work has focused on collaborations with artists including Bec Plexus and Ian Chang, Alarm Will Sound, Iarla Ŏ Lionáird, Hub New Music and Four/Ten Media, Shattered Glass, Nick Photinos, Sara Caswell, Jessica Meyer and Todd Reynolds.

Le Boeuf joined the faculty of the Blair School of Music at Vanderbilt University as Visiting Assistant Professor in Computer Music and Technology in 2021 and has since been named Contemporary Music Ensemble Director and Assistant Professor of the Practice of Music and Technology.

Accolades
Le Boeuf won first place in the 2008 International Songwriting Competition. He has won multiple Independent Music Awards in Jazz, Eclectic, Electronica, and Music Video categories.

Le Boeuf received a FROMM Commission from Harvard University in 2015, the 2015 ASCAP Foundation Johnny Mandel Prize, and 2011 and 2015 New Jazz Works Commissions from Chamber Music America in collaboration with JACK Quartet and Le Boeuf Brothers.

In 2017, Le Boeuf was nominated for a Grammy Award for Best Instrumental Composition for his work "Alkaline" from the album Imaginist recorded by the Le Boeuf Brothers and the JACK Quartet. He was also nominated for his work “Snapshots” in the same category in 2023. 

He is a Ph.D. candidate in Music Composition at Princeton University, and was awarded the Harold W. Dodds Honorific Fellowship in 2020.

Discography

Leader, featured artist

Collaborator
Tasha Warren & Dave Eggar, “Snapshots”, Ourself Behind Ourself, Concealed (Bright Shiny Things, 2022) – composer, pianist, editor
Real Loud, “Forbidden Subjects”, Real Loud (New Focus Recordings, 2021) – composer, producer
Bec Plexus + JACK Quartet and Ian Chang, “mirror image”, StickLip (New Amsterdam Records, 2020) – composer, producer, keyboardist
Barbora Kolářová, “Imp in Impulse”, Imp in Impulse (Furious Artisans, 2020) – composer, producer
Hub New Music, “Media Control”, July 3, 2020: A Benefit Compilation (New Amsterdam Records, 2020) – composer, producer
Wolff Parkinson White, Favours (Nonplace, 2020) – vocalist, composer 
Joy On Fire, Hymn (Procrastination Records, 2020) – pianist
Dmitri Tymoczko, Fools for Angels (New Focus Recordings, 2019) – pianist
Remy Le Boeuf, Light as a Word (Outside in Music, 2019) – co-producer
A New Age for New Age, “Our Kingdom”, New Age for a New Age Vol. 1 (NA4NA, 2019) – composer, producer, keyboardist  
Owen Lake and The Tragic Loves, The Best of Your Lies (Carrier Records, 2018) – keyboardist
Nick Photinos (featuring JACK Quartet, Charles Yang, and Jeffrey Zeigler), “Alpha”, Petits Artѐfacts (New Amsterdam Records, 2017) – composer, producer
Shattered Glass, “Transition Behavior”, Shattered Glass (Shattered Glass, 2017) – composer
Jesus on the Mainline, The Morning Bell (Ropeadope Records, 2017) – keyboardist
Empty Promise, Empty Promise – Single (Empty Promise, 2017) – co-composer, co-producer
Ian Rosenbaum, Memory Palace (National Sawdust Tracks, 2017) – co-producer
Allan Harris, Nobody’s Gonna Love You Better  (Love Productions Records/Membran Entertainment, 2016) – pianist, keyboardist, arranger, songwriter
RighteousGIRLS, Gathering Blue (New Focus Recordings, 2015) - composer, producer
Allan Harris, Black Bar Jukebox (Love Productions/Must Have Jazz, 2015) - pianist, keyboardist, arranger
ROMY, Unbound (Romy Balvers, 2014) - co-producer, keyboardist, backup vocalist
Natalie Cressman & Secret Garden, Unfolding (Cressman Music, 2012) – pianist
Michael Thomas, The Long Way (Michael Thomas, 2010) – pianist
Murray-James Morrison, Happy Every Day (Murray-James Morrison, 2010) – pianist
Bastien Weinhold, River Styx (FrameMusic, 2010) – pianist
Mike Ruby, Play Time (Alma/Universal Music, 2007) – pianist, keyboardist
Glass Eye Trio, Harajuku (Glass Eye Trio, 2007) – pianist, keyboardist
Colin Stranahan, Transfomation (Capri Records, 2006) – pianist, composer

Film and TV

References

1986 births
Living people
American jazz composers
American jazz pianists
Manhattan School of Music alumni
Musicians from Santa Cruz, California
Jazz musicians from California